The Journal of Organometallic Chemistry is a peer-reviewed scientific journal published by Elsevier, covering research on organometallic chemistry. According to the Journal Citation Reports, the journal has a 2021 impact factor of 2.345.

References

External links 
 

Organic chemistry journals
Elsevier academic journals
Publications established in 1964
English-language journals
Monthly journals